Lubrín is a municipality of Almería province, in the autonomous community of Andalusia, Spain.  It is located in the eastern foothills of the Sierra de los Filabres.  The main settlements in the municipality are Lubrín, La Rambla Aljibe, El Marchal de Lubrín, El Pilar de Lubrín, El Chive, El Pocico, La Alcarria de Lubrín and El Saetí.

Demographics

References

External links
  Lubrín - Sistema de Información Multiterritorial de Andalucía
  Lubrín - Diputación Provincial de Almería
  Lubrin Information - Tourist information for the town of Lubrin

Municipalities in the Province of Almería